The Collegiate Church of Notre-Dame is a Gothic church in Villeneuve-lès-Avignon, Gard, Occitanie, France.

History

It was completed in 1314 and consecrated in 1333 by cardinal Arnaud de Via, bishop of Cahors, and nephew of Pope John XXII. A bell tower was added in 1362. The church and its cloister were made a monument historique in 1862.

References

Bibliography (in French) 
 Joseph Girard, Évocation du Vieil Avignon, Les éditions de Minuit, Paris, 1958, 
 Jean-Marie Pérouse de Montclos (ed.), Le guide du patrimoine Languedoc Roussillon, Hachette, Paris, 2006, 
 Léon-Honoré Labande, in Congrès archéologique de France, 76e session. Avignon. 1909, Société française d'archéologie, Paris, 1910, tome 1, Guide du congrès, 
 Francis Salet, "L'église Notre-Dame de Villeneuve-lès-Avignon", dans Congrès archéologique de France. 121e session. Avignon et le Comtat Venaissin. 1963, Société française d'archéologie, Paris, 1963, 
 Marie-Luce Fabrié, "La collégiale Notre-Dame de Villeneuve-lez-Avignon", dans Congrès archéologique de France, 157e session. Gard. 1999, Société française d'archéologie, Paris, 2000, 
 Hervé Aliquot, Cyr Harispe, Collégiale d'Arnaud de Via. Un paradis de pierres à Villeneuve-lès-Avignon, Éditions École palatine, Avignon, 2010, 

Gothic architecture in France
Churches in Gard
Monuments historiques of Occitania (administrative region)
Villeneuve-lès-Avignon
14th-century Roman Catholic church buildings in France